The Jacobi Bound Problem concerns the veracity of Jacobi's inequality which is an inequality on the absolute dimension of a differential algebraic variety in terms of its defining equations.

The inequality is the differential algebraic analog of Bezout's theorem in affine space. 
Although first formulated by Jacobi, In 1936 Joseph Ritt recognized the problem as non-rigorous in that Jacobi didn't even have a rigorous notion of absolute dimension (Jacobi and Ritt used the term "order" - which Ritt first gave a rigorous definition for using the notion of transcendence degree). 
Intuitively, the absolute dimension is the number of constants of integration required to specify a solution of a system of ordinary differential equations.
A mathematical proof of the inequality has been open since 1936.

Statement
Let  be a differential field of characteristic zero and consider  a differential algebraic variety determined by the vanishing of differential polynomials . 

In the above display  is the *jacobi number*. 
It is defined to be 

.

References

Unsolved problems in mathematics
Differential algebra